Kadhal Kottai is a 1996 Indian Tamil-language romance film directed by Agathiyan. It stars Ajith Kumar and Devayani, with Heera, Thalaivasal Vijay, and Karan in supporting roles.

The film was a major commercial success and also won the National Film Award for Best Feature Film in Tamil, the National Film Award for Best Direction as well as the National Film Award for Best Screenplay for Agathiyan. It garnered positive critical acclaim upon release on 12 July 1996 and ran for over 270 days at the box office, becoming a silver-jubilee film. The film was remade in Kannada as Yaare Neenu Cheluve, in Hindi as Sirf Tum, and in Bengali as Hothat Brishti.

Plot 
Kamali, a graduate, lives with her sister Malliga and brother-in-law Shekar in Kotagiri, and is searching for a job. While visiting Madras, her purse is stolen and she fears she has lost her academic credentials. Suriya, an orphaned, carefree man who works in Jaipur, finds the purse and sends it back to her, and a love develops through letters. They agree to love each other without meeting, as she sews and sends a gift pack containing a lotus embroidered woollen sweater for him to wear when they meet for real. Suriya is soon transferred to Madras and stays with Siva, his new colleague. Kamali too comes to Madras to find a job and stays with her friend Jensi. Neya, Suriya's new boss, is immediately smitten by him, but her repeated attempts in gaining his love and affections fails as he is staunch about his love for Kamali. In the meantime, Suriya and Kamali run over upon each other without knowing who they really were, resulting in negative perception and misunderstanding. Refusing a job offer which would move her to Singapore, making it difficult for her to find Suriya, Kamali moves back to her home in despair.

Unable to withstand the advances of Neya, Suriya quits his job and gets sheltered by his friend Paneer, an auto rickshaw driver, who arranges him an auto rickshaw to drive for a living. Jeeva, a wealthy businessman, expresses his interest in marrying Kamali to Shekar, but Kamali excuses herself to consider her as prospective bride when she meets Jeeva in private and shares her unflinching love for Suriya, who even allows her to meet him for one last time. Shekar, who initially dissuades Kamali's love finally gives in and allows her to go to Madras half-heartedly. Upon arriving in Madras, which is experiencing severe monsoon, Kamali finds out that Jensi and the other hostel mates are not in town. Pinning hopes, she boards the Suriya's auto rickshaw, without knowing that it is him, and searches for him desperately. At the end of the day, both of them get refreshed at his place, where he dons the sweater gifted by her, covering it with his uniform. As Kamali plans to head home, depressed, Suriya helps her to board the Nilgiri Express. As the train departs, Suriya removes his shirt after tea spills over it. Kamali notices the sweater, deboards the train and the pair finally unite, as Paneer and Jensi look on and rejoice.

Cast 

 Ajith Kumar as Suriya
 Devayani as Kamali
 Heera as Neya
 Raja as Jeeva
 Karan as Siva
 Manivannan as Kaliyaperumal
 Thalaivasal Vijay as Paneer
 Rajeev as Sekhar
 Sabitha Anand as Malliga, Kamali's sister
 Pandu as Ramasamy
 Indhu as Kamali's friend
 Ra. Sankaran as Church Father
 LIC Narasimhan as Train passenger
 Ramji in a special appearance
 Rani in the song "Vellarikka"

Production 
The basic theme of the film was inspired from Purananuru literature on the relationship between King Kopperum Chozhan and poet Pisirandhaiyar, though they never met but they developed a strong relationship until their deaths. Agathiyan initially wanted to make his directorial debut with this subject since no producer were willing to produce the film, he made few films and earned his breakthrough with Vaanmathi. Post its success, he chose Ajith, the actor from that film to play the leading role with Sivasakthi Pandian agreeing to produce the film.

Agathiyan had asked Devayani to change her glamorous on screen image for the film, and Devayani duly agreed with the film becoming the start of several other similar roles for her. The film was initially titled Nila Nila Odi Vaa before it was renamed Kadhal Kottai. Raja was initially reluctant to act, but joined the cast at the director's insistence.

Soundtrack 
The music was composed by Deva and lyrics written by Agathiyan and Ponniyin Selvan.

Reception 
The Tamil magazine Ananda Vikatan appreciated the film by giving 52 marks, mentioning that the basic plot was a novel idea which had been given a good shape and life by the filmmaker. K. N. Vijiyan of New Straits Times wrote, "I had expected the usual story of college boy meeting girl with both parents objecting to their relationship. So I was pleasantly surprised when [Kaadhal Kottai] turned out to be a totally different experience." R. P. R. of Kalki also favourably reviewed the film, though they felt certain distracting moments such as Heera's revealing outfits, the dream sequence, auto stunt and fight sequences could have been avoided.

Accolades 
National Film Awards – 1996
 Best Film in Tamil
 Best Direction – Agathiyan
 Best Screenplay – Agathiyan

Filmfare Awards South – 1996
 Best Director – Agathian

Tamil Nadu State Film Awards – 1996
Tamil Nadu State Film Award for Best Film – Second Prize
 Best Director – Agathiyan
 Special Prize: Actress: Devayani
 Best Editor: Lancy–Mohan
 Best Costume Designer: Maasanam

Cinema Express Awards – 1996
Cinema Express Award for Best Film – Tamil

Remakes

Legacy 
Kadhal Kottai is considered a cult film and a landmark in Tamil cinema diverging from traditional romantic films of the time. This film has been included in the book Pride of Tamil Cinema written by G. Dhananjayan, which covers films between 1931 and 2013 that have earned national and international recognition. Dhananjayan wrote, "Kadhal Kottai is a trendsetting film which breathed new life into Tamil cinema and paved the way for revival of love themes in a big way". According to The Times of India the film hits the top list of romantic films made in Tamil cinema. The film also hit the list of top romantic films of Tamil magazines Ananda Vikatan and Dinamani. The film is considered one of the blockbuster films in the career of Ajith Kumar. The film was released as a novel in 2010 under the same name. In the 2021 film Master, a reference is made about the film when Vijay talks to Malavika Mohanan.

References

Bibliography

External links 
 

1990s Tamil-language films
1996 films
1996 romantic drama films
Best Tamil Feature Film National Film Award winners
Films directed by Agathiyan
Films scored by Deva (composer)
Films set in Rajasthan
Films set in Tamil Nadu
Films shot in Ooty
Films shot in Rajasthan
Films whose director won the Best Director National Film Award
Films whose writer won the Best Original Screenplay National Film Award
Indian romantic drama films
Tamil films remade in other languages